NGC 819 is a spiral galaxy approximately 302 million light-years away from Earth in the constellation of Triangulum. It forms a visual pair with the galaxy NGC 816 5.7' WNW.

Discovery 
NGC 819 was discovered by German astronomer Heinrich Louis d'Arrest on September 20, 1865 with the 11-inch refractor at Copenhagen. 
Édouard Stephan independently found the galaxy again on September 15, 1871 with the 31" reflector at Marseille Observatory.

Supernovae 
Supernova SN 2007hb was discovered in NGC 819 on August 24, 2007 by Nearby Supernova Factory. SN 2007hb had a magnitude of  about 19.5 and was located at RA 02h08m34.0s, DEC +29d14m14s, J2000.0. It was classified as a type SN Ib/c supernova.

Supernova SN 2016hkn was discovered in NGC 819 on October 22, 2016 by Fabio Briganti. SN 2014bu had a magnitude of about 17.2 and was located at RA 02h08m34.2s, DEC +29d14m11s, J2000.0. It was classified as a type II supernova.

See also 
 List of NGC objects (1–1000)

References

External links 

 
 SEDS

Spiral galaxies
Triangulum (constellation)
819
8174
Astronomical objects discovered in 1865
NGC 819